Redoan Rony is a Bangladeshi film director, producer and media executive who currently serves as the Chief operating officer of Chorki. He has spent more than a decade in the media industry of Bangladesh. He has directed a few of the most popular TV series of Bangladesh e.g. Housefull, Fnf, Behind The Scene, Pata Jharar Din, etc. Redoan Rony has been awarded Meril-Prothom Alo Award, CJFB Award, Bachsach Award, and many more. He won Bangladesh National Film Award for Best Dialogue and the film won 5 National Award for his directorial debut film Chorabali (2012).

Career
In his early career, Rony worked with Mostofa Sarwar Farooki as an assistant director in Chabial Team. After that, Rony made a lot of television fiction and series. His debut film Chorabali went on to win Bangladesh National Film Award in five categories. Then, he made his Second Feature film Ice Cream (2016).

He funded a Production house called Popcorn Entertainment. It currently operates for more than a decade in Bangladeshi Media.

Redoan Rony also makes TVCs for most renowned brands like Airtel, Robi, Banglalink, Prothom Alo, Square, Fresh, 7Up, Unilever, and so on.
He is now working on his third Feature Film and a Video Streaming Platform (OTT) Project as a COO.
He made popular TV series such as House Full, FNF aired by top rated TV channel in Bangladesh, and more than a hundred TV fictions like Urojahaz, Ucchotor Sharirik Biggan, Proof Reader, UTurn, Valobasa 101, Subornopur Beshi Dur Noy, Bagbondi, Mr. Johny, and Pata Jharar Din.

Television
While doing so many TV plays and Natoks, he also directed and created a bunch of TV shows with his very best friend Iftekhar Ahmed Fahmi. He directed his first TV show House Full which aired on NTV from 2008 to 2009. From there he made:
 Urojahaj: A Journey by Plane (2005)
 Bouchi: Tom & Jerry (2006)
 Shunchen, Ekjon Radio Jockey'r Golpo... (2007)
 Shokher Gari (2008)
 Biporite Ami... (2008)
 Housefull (2008-2009) (TV Series)
 Hello... (2009)
 Emon Deshti Kothao Khuje Pabe Nako Tumi (2009) (co-director)
 FnF (2010) (TV Series)
 Behind The Scene
 Jimmi (2010) (TV Mini Series)
 Bohurupi Himu (2011)
 Moneybag (2013) (TV Mini Series)
 Faad O Bogar Golpo (2013)
 U-Turn (2014)
 Bhalobasha 101 (2014)
 Behind the Trap (2014) (TV Mini Series)
 Deyaler Opare (2017)
 Chabial Reunion (2017) (TV Mini Series)
 Candy Crush (2018)
 Pata Jhorar Din (2018)
 Biyer Dawat Roilo (2018)
 Behind the Puppy (2020) (TV Mini Series)

Notable short films 
 Fera (2019)
 Shohojatri (2019)
 Chuti (2019)
 Ekti Dour Protijogita (2019)
 Oviman (2019)
 Eid Bondi (2019)
 Youtuber Er Eid (2019)

Films 
 Chorabali (2012)
 Ice Cream (2016)

Directorial debut
He and his friend Iftekhar Ahmed Fahmi joined the Chobial group in 2004. From there he learned filmmaking and direction, their first work together was a serial of Mostofa Sarwar Farooki called "69" which aired in Channel i. He also was an assistant director in the 2007 movie Made In Bangladesh. His first TV Movie he directed as a main director was Urojahaj, way back in 2005. From there he never turned back, and in 2012, he directed his first full-length film Chorabali, starring Indraneil Sengupta

Producer
 Morichika (2021)
 Networker Baire (2021)
 Munshigiri (2021)
 Khachar Bhitor Ochin Pakhi (2021)
 Jaago Bahey (2021)
 Shaaticup (2022)
 Taan (2022)
 Redrum (2022)
 Gunin (2022)
 Nikhoj (2022)

References

External links

Living people
Bangladeshi television directors
Bangladeshi film directors
Year of birth missing (living people)
Best Dialogue National Film Award (Bangladesh) winners